Aleksandar Raković (born 13 April 1968 in Niš, Nišava) is a retired male race walker from Serbia. He competed in three consecutive Summer Olympics for Serbia and Montenegro, starting in 1996.

Achievements

See also
 Serbian records in athletics

References

1970 births
Living people
Serbian male racewalkers
Athletes (track and field) at the 1996 Summer Olympics
Athletes (track and field) at the 2000 Summer Olympics
Athletes (track and field) at the 2004 Summer Olympics
Olympic athletes of Serbia and Montenegro
Olympic athletes of Yugoslavia
Sportspeople from Niš